Frederick Lundin (born Fredrik Lundin Larsson; May 18, 1868 – August 20, 1947) was a U.S. Representative from Illinois and a Republican Party ward boss in Chicago. He played an instrumental role in the successful mayoral elections of  William Hale Thompson and the creation of Thompson's patronage system. He also built up the organized syndicate later taken over by Al Capone in 1922.

Background
Frederick Lundin was born Fredrik Lundin Larsson in the parish of Västra Tollstad, Hästholmen, Ödeshög Municipality, Östergötland County, Sweden. His parents were Lars Fredrik Lundin and Fredrika Larsdotter. He had two sisters, Lovisa (1854–1873) and Elin. He immigrated with his parents and sister when he was a child to the United States and settled in Chicago, Illinois in 1880. After completing his academic studies, he served as president of  Lundin & Co. manufacturer of Lundin's Juniper Ade,  which was made from Juniper berry extract.

Career
Lundin served as a member of the Illinois State Senate from 1894–1898. He was later selected to serve as an alternate delegate to the Republican National Convention from Illinois in 1904. In 1908 Lundin was elected as a Republican Congressman to the 61st United States Congress from Illinois' 7th congressional district in Near North Side, Chicago. He was a one-term congressman from March 4, 1909 until March 3, 1911 and was defeated for reelection in 1910. He resumed manufacturing interests and became involved as a Republican party ward boss in Chicago. Richard Norton Smith describes Lundin as:

In exchange for his supporters voting as he told them, Lundin arranged jobs mainly in the municipal sector.
Lundin was instrumental in the election of William Hale Thompson as mayor in 1915 and succeeded in getting Thompson to appoint over 30,000 supporters to the city payroll in a form of political graft as all were required to kick back part of their pay to Lundin's organization. In 1922, Lundin was  indicted on a charge of embezzling tax money. Although he was acquitted, this was the beginning of the end of his career as a political boss.

Lundin died in Beverly Hills, California on August 20, 1947 and was interred in Forest Home Cemetery, Forest Park, Illinois.

See also
William Lorimer (politician)

Bibliography

References

1868 births
1947 deaths
People from Ödeshög Municipality
Businesspeople from Chicago
Politicians from Chicago
Burials at Forest Home Cemetery, Chicago
Swedish emigrants to the United States
Republican Party Illinois state senators
Republican Party members of the United States House of Representatives from Illinois